Aberdeen is a neighbourhood on the west side of Abbotsford, British Columbia, Canada.

References

Neighbourhoods in Abbotsford, British Columbia